This is a compilation of every international soccer game played by the United States men's national soccer team from 1980 through 1989. It includes the team's record for that year, each game and the date played. It also lists the U.S. goal scorers.

The format is: home team listed first, U.S. listed first at home or neutral site.

Records are in win–loss–tie format. Games decided in penalty kicks are counted as ties, as per the FIFA standard.

1980

1981

1982

1983

1984

1985

1986

1987

1988

1989

External links
 USA - Details of International Matches 1980-1989
 USA Men's National Team: All-time Results, 1885-1989
 U.S. SOCCER FEDERATION 2016 MEN’S NATIONAL TEAM MEDIA GUIDE

1980
1980 in American soccer
1981 in American soccer
1982 in American soccer
1983 in American soccer
1984 in American soccer
1985 in American soccer
1986 in American soccer
1987 in American soccer
1988 in American soccer
1989 in American soccer